Runnymede was an English association football club, founded in 1876.  The club's first recorded match was in November that year against St Mark's of Windsor.

The club entered the FA Cup once, in 1878-79.  In the first round, the club played Panthers F.C., at home.  The match ended in a draw, but Runnymede withdrew rather than take part in a replay.

Despite having a full fixture list in 1876-77 and 1877–78, the club seems to have disbanded by 1879–80.  The club relied on players from St Mark's and the University of Cambridge so on their graduation the club lost access to those players.

Famous players

Harry Goodhart, FA Cup winner with the Old Etonians F.C.

Charles Bambridge, England international

Harry Sedgwick, player with the Old Etonians and a goalscorer for the England Probables side in 1878 and reserve for the England v Scotland match in 1879

Colours

The club played in light blue and brown quarters, which, in the context of the times, usually referred to halves.

References

Association football clubs established in 1876
Defunct football clubs in England
1876 establishments in England
Association football clubs established in the 19th century